The Cape Verde women's national basketball team represents Cape Verde in international competitions. It is administered by the Federação Cabo-verdiana de Basquetebol.

African Championship record
2005 – 7th
2007 – 9th
2013 – 9th
2019 – 9th
2021 – 10th

Current roster
Roster for the 2021 Women's Afrobasket.

References

External links
FIBA profile
Cape Verde Basketball Records at FIBA Archive

Women's national basketball teams
Basketball
Basketball in Cape Verde
Basketball teams in Cape Verde